Nothorites  is a genus of a sole described species of trees, constituting part of the plant family Proteaceae. The species Nothorites megacarpus grows naturally only in restricted mountain regions (endemic) of the wet tropics rain forests of north-eastern Queensland, Australia.

The species was first formally scientifically described as Orites megacarpa in 1995 by Alex S. George and Bernie P. M. Hyland. Genetic studies published in 2008 by Austin Mast and colleagues demonstrated that it was not correlated with other species in the genus Orites. Instead it correlates with the group of Macadamia related species and genera. Therefore, the new genus Nothorites was created and this species name combination was published.

The species occurs in rainforests around Mount Spurgeon and Mount Lewis (both inland above Mossman) as well as Mount Bartle Frere at an altitude of 1100 to 1200 metres.

References

External links
 Photographs of Nothorites megacarpus at the Australian Plant Image Index

Proteaceae
Monotypic Proteaceae genera
Endemic flora of Queensland
Proteales of Australia
Wet Tropics of Queensland